South Chingford Foundation School (formerly Rush Croft Sports College and Rush Croft Foundation School) is a coeducational secondary school and sixth form with academy status, located in the Chingford area of the London Borough of Waltham Forest, England.

The school was awarded specialist Sports College status, before converting to academy status on 1 October 2012. Since converting to an academy, the school is now run by the Chingford Academies Trust, which also includes Chingford Foundation School. The current headteacher of both schools is Jane Benton who took control replacing Mark Morall in 2019.

The school's motto/vision is 'Building ambition for all'.

Notable former pupils 
Patrick Agyemang, footballer
Curtis Davies, footballer
Daniel Fogg, swimmer
Andros Townsend, footballer

References

External links
 

Secondary schools in the London Borough of Waltham Forest
Academies in the London Borough of Waltham Forest
Educational institutions established in 1978